Chris Watson (כריס ווטסון; born July 16, 1975) is an American–Israeli former basketball player, who has played on the Israel national basketball team, and whose positions have been power forward and center.  He is 6' 7" (200 cm) tall.

He attended Niagara University, where he led the Conference in 2-point field goals (165) in 1995–1996. He was inducted into the Niagara University Hall of Fame.

Watson has played professional basketball for two decades. He has played primarily in  Israel (with Hapoel Tel Aviv, Hapoel Holon, Ironi Ramat Gan, GreenTops Netanya, and Ironi Ashkelon). Watson won the Israeli Championship with Hapoel Holon in 2007–2008, and again in 2008–2009. He was selected to the Israeli Basketball Premier League All-Star Game in 2011. Watson has twice played on the Israel national basketball team.

Personal life
Watson was born in White Plains, New York. Watson attended White Plains High School, and then transferred to Archbishop Stepinac High School ('93). He married an Israeli woman, Roni, and in 2003 he became an Israeli citizen. He and his wife have a daughter, Dream.

College

He attended Niagara University, where he played for the Purple Eagles basketball team in the Metro Atlantic Athletic Conference.  He led the team in scoring in his final three seasons, and was third in the Conference in scoring in both his junior (16.8 points per game) and senior (17.4 points per game, as he led the Conference with a .568 field goal percentage) seasons. He also led the Conference in 2-point field goals (165) in 1995–1996, was second in 2-point field goals (167) in 1996-1997   His 16 field goals in a game against Siena on February 19, 1996, are tied for the most ever in a Conference game. He earned All-MAAC Tournament honors in both 1996 and 1997. He earned All-MAAC Second Team honors during the 1994–95 season, and was All-MAAC First Team in the 1995–96 season.

He finished his college career with 1,711 career points, fourth at the time in Niagara history. He graduated in 1996. In 2016 he was inducted into the Niagara University Hall of Fame.

Professional basketball
Watson has played professional basketball for two decades. He has played in Belgium (Leuven Bears), Sweden, the United Kingdom, Uruguay, and Israel (Hapoel Tel Aviv, Hapoel Holon, Ironi Ramat Gan, GreenTops Netanya, and Ironi Ashkelon).

He played two seasons in Uruguay where he was the second-leading scorer of the Uruguayan League, two seasons in Sweden (KFUM Jamtland), and half a season in England.

Coming to Israel, he played in Hadera and then for Hapoel Tel Aviv.  The following season Watson played for Migdal Ha'emek.

Watson won the Israeli Championship with Hapoel Holon in 2007–2008, and again in 2008–2009.  He represented Israel at the Qualifications to European Championships 2009.

He played for Ironi Ramat Gan in the National League in 2009–2010. Watson was selected to the Israeli Basketball Premier League All-Star Game in 2011.

In 2013-14 Watson played for Ironi Kiryat Ata. He played for Hapoel Be'er Sheva in the Israel National League from 2014 to 2016.

Watson also played on the Israel national basketball team.

References 

1975 births
Living people
American emigrants to Israel
Naturalized citizens of Israel
Centers (basketball)
Hapoel Be'er Sheva B.C. players
Hapoel Holon players
Hapoel Migdal HaEmek B.C. players
Hapoel Tel Aviv B.C. players
Ironi Ashkelon players
Ironi Ramat Gan players
Ironi Kiryat Ata players
Israeli American
Israeli Basketball Premier League players
Israeli men's basketball players
Israeli people of African-American descent
KK Olimpija players
Leuven Bears players
Niagara Purple Eagles men's basketball players
People from White Plains, New York
Power forwards (basketball)
African-American basketball players
American men's basketball players
American expatriate basketball people in Israel
Archbishop Stepinac High School alumni
White Plains High School alumni
21st-century African-American sportspeople
20th-century African-American sportspeople